Girl vs. Monster is a 2011 American fantasy teen comedy Disney Channel Original Movie that premiered on October 12, 2011. The film stars Olivia Holt as Skylar, a teenage girl who discovers on the eve of Halloween that she is a fifth-generation monster hunter and that her parents are active monster hunters. The film was directed by Stuart Gillard and produced by Tracey Jeffrey.

Plot
The movie begins on the day before Halloween with Skylar, a fearless 15-year-old teenager with a powerful singing voice, prepares for the ultimate Halloween Bash with her best friends, Henry and Sadie. The plan is for Skylar to sing at the party, with rock band member Ryan Dean. Skylar is crushed when the next afternoon, her parents make her stay home and even activate an alarm system to keep her in. She attempts to sneak out of the house by cutting the power so the alarm system won't work. That unfortunately unleashes a monster named Deimata (that was contained in her parents' monster containment unit) who is determined to feed on the fear of Skylar and her family forever. As Skylar’s world is turned upside down, she learns that her parents have been keeping a big secret – that she comes from a long line of monster hunters. She is the 5th generation. Now, it’s up to Skylar and her friends to channel their inner strength and conquer more than just this monster. Every person has their own personal monster, which feeds on their fear.

Now that Deimata is loose, Skylar (whose ability to feel fear was blocked since infancy by Deimata) experiences all the fear she never had before and tries to deny what is happening. She, Sadie and Henry go, armed with Skylar's parents' monster-hunting tools, to the party at the McQuarry Mansion. But Henry becomes frozen in fear, after being scared by his monster. Cobb, her parents' assistant, comes and takes him back home to fix him. Meanwhile, Deimata lures Skylar's parents into a trap by pretending that Skylar is in trouble. After this, Myra, Skylar's rival, who is at home with a broken neck, is eating ice cream. Soon, the red smoke comes out and it transforms into Deimata. She then controls Myra and goes to the party where she publicly insults Skylar of being nervous to sing at Ryan's party and Sadie comforts Skylar after she runs out, embarrassed. A possessed Myra sings in Skylar's place and turns to Theodosia and Bob (Sadie and Henry's monsters). Myra falls downstairs after Deimata leaves Myra's body as Skylar and Sadie find her. Myra informs them about Deimata and how she can possess people- like she did with her. Skylar thanks her, and she and Sadie rush to save the people upstairs.

During a confrontation with his personal monster, a fixed and armed Henry learns that letting go of his fears will cause the monsters to disintegrate into nothing. He goes to the mansion to inform Skylar of this. So, she grabs the microphone and tells Ryan to grab his guitar and meet her outside. But, Deimata possesses Ryan to better discourage Skylar from facing her fears, but he manages to break free by facing his greatest fear: asking Skylar out. Skylar faces her fears and sings in front of everybody, while Ryan and his band performs as well. While Skylar sings, all the monsters vanish and Sadie also gathers the courage to stand up to Theodosia by spelling things she couldn't when she was a little girl. When all the monsters are all vanquished, Deimata comes and reveals she cannot be destroyed that way. She then  reminds Skylar that she still has Skylar's parents in captivity, and Skylar rushes off to find them, with Sadie and Henry following behind with everybody especially Ryan and Myra watches them from a distance.

Skylar and her friends try to fight off Deimata, but she doesn't seem able to be stopped. Although Skylar has overcome her fear, she soon realizes Deimata is still feeding off of her parents' fears—about Skylar's safety.  Once Skylar gets her parents to trust her, Deimata is weakened and the three friends defeat her and capture her. At the end of the movie, Henry and Sadie are shown having no fear by doing what they are scared about doing the most. Later that day, Skylar, Ryan and Myra sing at Ryan's party in his basement. Myra becomes friends with Skylar.

Cast
 Olivia Holt as Skylar Lewis, a strong, fearless teenage girl with a powerful singing voice. Learning that her parents are monster hunters and that Deimata is on the loose, she discovers her biggest fear for the first time: stage fright.
 Brendan Meyer as Henry, Skylar's best friend who is not too brave and is routinely bullied by the school jocks.
 Kerris Dorsey as Sadie, Skylar's nervous best friend who dreads public speaking.
 Luke Benward as Ryan Dean, a friend of Skylar who has a crush on her. He is the lead guitarist in his band called The Backbeats. His fear is asking Skylar out.
 Katherine McNamara as Myra Santelli, Ryan's ex-girlfriend who resents Skylar until she saves her from Deimata.
 Tracy Dawson as Deimata, Skylar's personal monster who previously tormented her grandfather before his death.
 Anna Galvin as Theodosia, Sadie's personal monster who represents her fear of failing in school. She frightened Sadie during tests, quizzes, and reports. She even scared her so badly during the fifth grade spelling bee, which led to her misspelling "goat".
 Stefano Giulianetti as Bob The Scarecrow, Henry's personal monster who represents his dismay of being a coward.
 Jennifer Aspen as Julie Lewis, Skylar's mother and a fourth-generation monster hunter.
 Brian Palermo as Steve Lewis, Skylar's father and a monster hunter.
 Adam Chambers as Cobb, a friend of Skylar and her family and a monster hunter-in-training. He helps Skylar, Henry and Sadie capture the monsters that were released.
 Kurt Ostlund as Lead Jock and Henry's bully.

Songs
 "Fearless" – Olivia Holt 
 "Had Me @ Hello" – Luke Benward
 "Nothing's Gonna Stop Me" – Olivia Holt
 "Had Me @ Hello" – Olivia Holt
 "I Got My Scream On" – China Anne McClain
 "Nothing's Gonna Stop Me (Reprise)" – Katherine McNamara
 "Had Me @ Hello" – Olivia Holt, Luke Benward & Katherine McNamara

Reception
It premiered on Friday, October 12, 2012, earning 4.9 million viewers with the number 1 scripted cable TV telecast of the night and second TV movie of 2012 in kids tweens and teens 6–14  The film had 271,000 viewers in the UK and Ireland when it premiered on October 26, 2012.

References

External links

 
 

2012 television films
2012 films
2010s comedy horror films
2012 fantasy films
2010s science fiction films
2010s teen films
American comedy horror films
American fantasy films
American fantasy comedy films
American teen comedy films
Disney Channel Original Movie films
Films about fear
American films about Halloween
Films directed by Stuart Gillard
Films shot in Vancouver
2010s monster movies
American monster movies
2012 comedy films
2010s English-language films
American drama television films
2010s American films